Shmelyov or Shmelev is a surname. It is derived from the sobriquet "шмель" ("Bumblebee"). Notable people with the surname include:

Daria Shmeleva (born 1994), Russian track cyclist
Darya Shmeleva (born 1976), Russian swimmer
Ivan Shmelyov (1873–1950), Russian émigré writer
Stanislav Edward Shmelev, ecological economist affiliated with the International Society for Ecological Economics
Vladimir Shmelyov (born 1946), Soviet modern pentathlete and Olympic Champion

Russian-language surnames